Senotainia is a genus of satellite flies in the family Sarcophagidae. There are more than 70 described species in Senotainia.

Species
These 76 species belong to the genus Senotainia:

S. aegyptiaca Rohdendorf, 1935
S. albifrons (Rondani, 1859)
S. anamalaica Verves, 1988
S. angolae Zumpt, 1976
S. arabops (Séguy, 1953)
S. arenicola Reinhard, 1963
S. armenica Rohdendorf, 1935
S. barchanica Rohdendorf, 1935
S. beludzhistanica Rohdendorf, 1961
S. brasiliensis (Townsend, 1929)
S. caffra (Macquart, 1846)
S. caspica Rohdendorf, 1935
S. chivica Rohdendorf, 1935
S. conica (Fallén, 1810)
S. currani Zumpt, 1961
S. cuthbertsoni Zumpt, 1952
S. deemingi Zumpt, 1970
S. deserta Rohdendorf, 1935
S. dubiosa Zumpt, 1961
S. efflatouni (Rohdendorf, 1935)
S. egregia (Zimin, 1928)
S. fani Verves, 1994
S. fera (Robineau-Desvoidy, 1830)
S. flavicornis (Townsend, 1891)
S. fulvicornis (Wulp, 1890)
S. fuscula Zumpt, 1976
S. grisea (Villeneuve, 1916)
S. himalayica Rohdendorf, 1966
S. inyoensis Reinhard, 1955
S. iranica Rohdendorf, 1961
S. irwini Zumpt, 1973
S. kansensis (Townsend, 1892)
S. kozlovi Rohdendorf & Verves, 1980
S. litoralis Allen, 1924
S. mongolica Rohdendorf & Verves, 1980
S. morula Zumpt, 1976
S. murgabica Rohdendorf, 1935
S. nana Coquillett, 1897
S. navigatrix (Meijere, 1910)

S. nigeriensis Zumpt, 1970
S. nitidula (Bigot, 1881)
S. nuda Zumpt, 1952
S. opiparis Reinhard, 1955
S. patersoni Zumpt, 1961
S. pollenia (Curran, 1936)
S. pretoria (Curran, 1936)
S. puncticornis (Zetterstedt, 1859)
S. ravilla Zumpt, 1961
S. repetek Pape, 1996
S. richteri (Rohdendorf, 1961)
S. rognesi Verves, 1995
S. rossica Rohdendorf, 1935
S. rubriventris Macquart, 1846
S. rufiventris (Coquillett, 1897)
S. schaeuffelei (Rohdendorf, 1961)
S. setulicosta Allen, 1926
S. sibirica Rohdendorf, 1935
S. similis (Townsend, 1891)

S. sinopis Reinhard, 1955
S. smithersi Zumpt, 1961
S. stackelbergi Verves, 1979
S. syczewskajae Rohdendorf & Verves, 1980
S. tanzaniae Zumpt, 1976
S. tedzhenica Verves, 1979
S. tricuspis (Meigen, 1838)
S. trifida Pape, 1989
S. trilineata (Wulp, 1890)
S. turkmenica Rohdendorf, 1935
S. ulukitkani Kolomiets, 1979
S. vigilans Allen, 1924
S. wilkini Zumpt, 1961
S. xizangensis Fan, 1981
S. zaitzevi Verves, 1984
S. zimini (Rohdendorf, 1961)

References

Sarcophagidae
Oestroidea genera
Taxa named by Pierre-Justin-Marie Macquart